The Artois class were a series of nine frigates built to a 1793 design by Sir John Henslow, which served in the Royal Navy during the French Revolutionary and Napoleonic Wars.

Seven of these ships were built by contract with commercial builders, while the remaining pair (Tamar and Clyde) were dockyard-built  – the latter built using "fir" (pitch pine) instead of the normal oak.

They were armed with a main battery of 28 eighteen-pounder cannon on their upper deck, the main gun deck of a frigate. Besides this battery, they also carried two 9-pounders together with twelve 32-pounder carronades on the quarter deck, and another two 9-pounders together with two 32-pounder carronades on the forecastle.

Ships in class

Citations

References
Robert Gardiner, The Heavy Frigate, Conway Maritime Press, London 1994.
Rif Winfield, British Warships in the Age of Sail 1793-1817: Design, Construction, Careers and Fates. 2nd edition, Seaforth Publishing, 2008. .

 
Frigate classes
Frigates of the Royal Navy
Ship classes of the Royal Navy